Flushing Town Hall is a historic Town Hall located on Northern Boulevard at Linden Place in the Flushing section of the New York City borough of Queens.  Formerly, it served as the seat of government of the village of Flushing, established as Vlissingen in 1645, until the consolidation with New York City in 1898.  It was built in 1862 and is a 2-story, three-by-six-bay, brick building with basement and attic.  A style of architecture that originated in Germany, Rundbogenstil ("round arch style"), was used here and in a number of American buildings of the Civil War Era.  The earliest photographs show the building to have been painted a light color.  The use of paint was discontinued following adhesion problems during a restoration.  A small rear wing was added in 1938 containing a block of jail cells.  The front facade features a triple arched portico topped by a classic entablature with low balustrade.

It was listed as a New York City Landmark in 1968 and on the National Register of Historic Places in 1972.

The building houses the Flushing Council on Culture and the Arts (FCCA). As a member of New York City's Cultural Institutions Group (CIG), the FCCA serves as stewards of Flushing Town Hall, restoring, managing and programming the historic 1862 landmark on behalf of the City of New York. FCCA celebrates the history of Queens as the home of jazz by presenting jazz performance.

See also
List of New York City Designated Landmarks in Queens
National Register of Historic Places listings in Queens County, New York

References

External links

Flushing Council on Culture and the Arts (FCCA) website 
Flushing Town Hall website

Government buildings on the National Register of Historic Places in New York City
Government buildings completed in 1862
Government buildings in Queens, New York
New York City Designated Landmarks in Queens, New York
Flushing, Queens
1862 establishments in New York (state)
National Register of Historic Places in Queens, New York
City and town halls on the National Register of Historic Places in New York (state)